Günther Schwarz (11 November 1941 – 12 March 2022) was a German politician.

Biography
A member of the Christian Democratic Union of Germany, he served in the Landtag of Saarland from 1975 to 1990.

Schwarz died on 12 March 2022, at the age of 80.

References

1941 births
2022 deaths
German politicians
Christian Democratic Union of Germany politicians
Members of the Landtag of Saarland
People from Saarpfalz-Kreis
Recipients of the Cross of the Order of Merit of the Federal Republic of Germany